The Bonners Ferry Main Post Office in Bonners Ferry, Idaho was built in 1938.  It was listed on the National Register of Historic Places in 1989 as U.S. Post Office – Bonners Ferry Main.

Its design is credited to Louis A. Simon and it is Classical Revival in style.
It is a two-story building on a raised basement.

It is located at 7167 1st St. or 215 First.?

References

Post office buildings on the National Register of Historic Places in Idaho
Neoclassical architecture in Idaho
Government buildings completed in 1938
Buildings and structures in Boundary County, Idaho
1938 establishments in Idaho